Washington Township is the name of twenty-eight townships in Missouri:

 Washington Township, Buchanan County, Missouri
 Washington Township, Carroll County, Missouri
 Washington Township, Cedar County, Missouri
 Washington Township, Clark County, Missouri
 Washington Township, Clay County, Missouri
 Washington Township, Dade County, Missouri
 Washington Township, Dallas County, Missouri
 Washington Township, Daviess County, Missouri
 Washington Township, DeKalb County, Missouri
 Washington Township, Douglas County, Missouri
 Washington Township, Franklin County, Missouri
 Washington Township, Greene County, Missouri
 Washington Township, Grundy County, Missouri
 Washington Township, Harrison County, Missouri
 Washington Township, Jackson County, Missouri
 Washington Township, Johnson County, Missouri
 Washington Township, Laclede County, Missouri
 Washington Township, Lafayette County, Missouri
 Washington Township, Mercer County, Missouri
 Washington Township, Monroe County, Missouri
 Washington Township, Nodaway County, Missouri
 Washington Township, Osage County, Missouri
 Washington Township, Pettis County, Missouri
 Washington Township, Ripley County, Missouri
 Washington Township, St. Clair County, Missouri
 Washington Township, Stone County, Missouri
 Washington Township, Vernon County, Missouri
 Washington Township, Webster County, Missouri

See also

Washington Township (disambiguation)

Missouri township disambiguation pages